Tomás Gómez Franco (born 27 March 1968) is a Spanish politician and member of the Spanish Socialist Workers' Party (PSOE), former Secretary-General of the PSOE Madrid branch. Until 2013, Gomez served as a member of the Senate of Spain. In October 2010 he was selected as the PSOE candidate for President of Madrid in the 2011 assembly elections. However, the PSOE received their worst ever result in those elections.

On 11 February 2015, he was dismissed from the PSOE regional leadership by the party's Secretary-General Pedro Sánchez after suspicions of Gómez being involved in a corruption scandal during his time as Mayor of Parla. Gómez, alongside the party's regional leadership, refused to stand down and accused Sánchez of "authoritarianism", defending his personal honor and announcing possible legal actions against the party's National Executive headed by Sánchez for violating party statutes.

References

1968 births
Complutense University of Madrid alumni
Leaders of political parties in Spain
Living people
Members of the Senate of Spain
People from Enschede
Spanish Socialist Workers' Party politicians
Members of the 9th Assembly of Madrid
City councillors in the Community of Madrid
Mayors of places in the Community of Madrid
Members of the Socialist Parliamentary Group (Assembly of Madrid)